The cresthead flounder (Pseudopleuronectes schrenki) is a flatfish of the family Pleuronectidae. It is a demersal fish that lives on bottoms in salt water in the temperate waters of the northwestern Pacific, from the southern parts of the Sea of Okhotsk and the Kuril Islands to Korea and northern Honshu, Japan.

References

cresthead flounder
Fish of the North Pacific
cresthead flounder